Stone inscriptions in the Kathmandu Valley (Nepal Bhasa:नेपाःमन्दःया ल्वंह पौत) refer to ancient stone slabs, pillars and pedestals with text carved on them. They are the most important sources for the history of Nepal. A vast majority of the inscriptions found in Nepal are from the Kathmandu Valley where they are an ubiquitous element at heritage sites. They consist of royal edicts and dedicatory notes on Hindu and Buddhist temples, stupas, statues, water spouts and other architectural structures. Stone inscriptions are locally referred as Lōhan Pau (Nepal bhasa:).

The early inscriptions are from the Licchavi period, and date from the fifth to the ninth centuries. They number more than 170, and are carved in Sanskrit language and Gupta script. Inscriptions from the 14th century onwards, which are the most numerous, are in Newar language (Nepal Bhasa) and Nepal script. The earliest dated inscription in Nepal Bhasa is dated Nepal Era 293 (1173 AD).

Oldest inscription
The oldest dated inscription in Kathmandu dates from the year 107 of the Saka era which corresponds to 184/185 AD. This date was accepted by all historians except Dinesh Chandra Regmi who assigned it to the Gupta era (started on A.D. 320). Paleo-graphically he says it to be close to Samudra Gupta's Allahabad inscription (A.D. 360). The inscription is carved in Gupta characters, also known as Brahmi script, on the pedestal of a statue of King Jayavarman. It was unearthed at a building site in Maligaon in 1992. The language is Sanskrit.

Prior to this discovery, the distinction of the oldest dated stone inscription in the valley was held by an inscription carved on a pillar installed next to the Changu Narayan Temple in Bhaktapur which is dedicated to a Hindu deity Vishnu. It was inscribed in the year 383 which corresponds to 464 AD. It is written in the Sanskrit language and Gupta characters.

Multilingual inscriptions

Among the thousands of Nepal language inscriptions scattered across Nepal Mandala, or the Kathmandu Valley and its neighborhood, there are a few inscribed in other languages too. King Pratap Malla's polyglot inscription dated Nepal Era 774 (1654 AD) at Kathmandu Durbar Square is an example of his linguistic interest. The massive stone with spouts to dispense water to travelers is carved in 15 languages including Greek, French and Persian.

Three inscriptions written in Nepali (Khas Kura, Gorkhali) have been found in the Kathmandu Valley, all of them from the period in which Pratap Malla featured prominently in the politics of Kantipur. There is one at Makhan dated 1641 AD. Although it acknowledges Jaya Laxmi Malla, Pratap Malla's father, its date is very close to the formal commencement of Pratap Malla's ascension to the throne. Another at Guheswari bears the name Pratap Malla. Another famed stone inscription of Pratap Malla installed at Rani Pokhari pond contains writings in three languages: Sanskrit, Nepali and Nepal Bhasa. It is dated Nepal Era 790 (1670 AD) and describes the construction of Rani Pokhari and its religious significance.

A large stone inscription containing texts in Nepal Bhasa and Tibetan is installed at the Swayambhu stupa complex. It records the renovation of the stupa during the years 1751-1758. The epitaph on the tombstone of a Capuchin missionary named Francesco della Penna, who died and was buried in Patan in 1745, contains texts in Latin and Nepal Bhasa.

Gallery

References

History of Kathmandu
Epigraphy
Newar language
Nepali language
Sanskrit inscriptions
History of Nepal
Inscriptions
Nepalese inscriptions